WSRC may refer to:

 WSRC (FM), a radio station (88.1 FM) licensed to serve Waynetown, Indiana, United States
 WQTM, a radio station (1480 AM) licensed to serve Fair Bluff, North Carolina, United States, which held the call sign WSRC from June 2006 to January 2009
 WRJD, a radio station (1410 AM) licensed to serve Durham, North Carolina, which used the call sign WSRC until March 2006 
 Washington Savannah River Company, SRS
 West Side Rowing Club, a rowing club in Buffalo, New York, United States
 Westinghouse Savannah River Company, SRS